MGV may refer to:

 MGV (composition) ("Musique à Grand Vitesse"), a 1993 composition by Michael Nyman
 MGV (TV station)
 MGV-176, a Yugoslavian sub-machine gun
 Manned Ground Vehicles, part of the U.S. Army's Future Combat Systems
 Matengo language (ISO 639:mgv)
 Madhuban Goenka Vidyalaya, a school in Nidaya, West Bengal, India
 C31 Melbourne, with the call sign MGV-32
 A prefix used in the Verve Records discography until 1961